Sympycnus desoutteri is a species of fly in the family Dolichopodidae. It is found in the  Palearctic .

References

External links
Images representing Sympycninae at BOLD

Sympycninae
Insects described in 1925
Asilomorph flies of Europe
Taxa named by Octave Parent